Szilárd Németh (born 8 August 1977) is a Slovak former professional footballer who played as a striker.

After playing for clubs in Slovakia and the Czech Republic, he spent four-and-a-half seasons at Middlesbrough of the Premier League from 2001 to 2006. After a brief stint at France's RC Strasbourg, he played for Alemannia Aachen in Germany until his retirement in 2010.

Németh was at that time the highest scorer in the history of the Slovakia national team, with 22 goals in 58 matches from 1997 to 2006.

Club career

Early career
Németh started his career with Slovan Bratislava before moving to eastern Slovakia to join 1. FC Košice. At both clubs he played well, he moved to giants of the region, Czech team Sparta Prague for record fee 35 million CZK (€1.3 million) 

From here he moved back to Slovakia with one of the top teams in the country, Inter Bratislava. He won consecutive Slovak Super Liga titles in 1999–2000 and 2000–01, finishing as top-scorer in both.

Middlesbrough
Amid rumoured interest from Inter Milan, he eventually signed for English side Middlesbrough on 12 April 2001 for £2.1 million on a five-year contract. Earlier that season, he had a trial at their local rivals Sunderland.

Németh scored 23 goals in 117 Premier League appearances for the club. He became known as the Lizard King of Teesside and Slovakian Express for scoring regularly off the bench. Németh was part of Middlesbrough's 2004 League Cup-winning team, despite not making the squad for the final. He also featured as they contested the UEFA Cup in the next two seasons. During his time in the Premier League, he scored in wins over Chelsea, Manchester United, Liverpool and Tottenham Hotspur.

The 2005–06 season saw Németh turn down numerous transfer offers, including UEFA Cup winners CSKA Moscow. He faced competition up-front that season from Yakubu, Mark Viduka, Jimmy Floyd Hasselbaink and Massimo Maccarone, leading to his exit in January.

Later career
On 25 January 2006, Németh was sold to French club RC Strasbourg for a 'nominal fee'. Their season ended with relegation from Ligue 1, and he was released.

On 28 August 2006, he agreed to join the German Bundesliga club Alemannia Aachen in a two-year deal. Németh spent most of his first season on the sidelines because of a pulmonary embolism. On 19 May 2008, he signed a contract extension with Aachen until the end of the 2009–10 season. In the winter of 2010–11, he opted to retire from football due to health problems.

International career
Németh scored 22 times in 58 matches for Slovakia between 1997 and 2006. His debut was a 4–0 friendly win against Belarus at the Štadión pod Zoborom in Nitra on 2 February 1997, replacing Róbert Semeník for the final 26 minutes. He scored his first goal on his third cap on 5 February 1997, in a 2–2 draw away against Costa Rica. Németh's last goal came in his 55th international on 1 March 2006, in an away friendly win over France. His last game was on 6 September 2006, in qualification for Euro 2008, a 3–0 home defeat to the Czech Republic. He was the country's highest-scorer until Róbert Vittek broke the record, and is their seventh most-capped player.

Personal life
Németh belongs to the Hungarian minority in Slovakia.

Career statistics
Scores and results list Slovakia's goal tally first, score column indicates score after each Németh goal.

Honours
Slovan Bratislava
Slovak Super Liga: 1994-95, 1995-96
Slovak Cup: 1996-97

Inter Bratislava
Slovak Super Liga: 1999–2000, 2000–01
Slovak Cup: 1999–2000, 2000–01

Middlesbrough
Football League Cup: 2003–04

Individual
Slovak Footballer of the Year: 2000
Slovak Super Liga top scorer: 1999–2000, 2000–01

References

External links
 

Living people
1977 births
Sportspeople from Komárno
Hungarians in Slovakia
Association football forwards
Slovak footballers
ŠK Slovan Bratislava players
FC VSS Košice players
Czech First League players
AC Sparta Prague players
FK Inter Bratislava players
Middlesbrough F.C. players
RC Strasbourg Alsace players
Alemannia Aachen players
Slovak Super Liga players
Premier League players
Ligue 1 players
Bundesliga players
2. Bundesliga players
Slovakia international footballers
Slovakia under-21 international footballers
Slovak expatriate footballers
Slovak expatriate sportspeople in the Czech Republic
Slovak expatriate sportspeople in England
Slovak expatriate sportspeople in France
Slovak expatriate sportspeople in Germany
Expatriate footballers in the Czech Republic
Expatriate footballers in England
Expatriate footballers in France
Expatriate footballers in Germany
Slovak people of Hungarian descent